The Land grant to Munnabittu kudurru is an elongated egg-shaped black limestone ancient Mesopotamian narû or entitlement stele (kudurru), 46.5 cm high and 20.5 cm wide, which details the reconfirmation of a gift of 30 GUR of land (around 750 acres) by Kassite king Marduk-apla-iddina I to his servant Munnabittu (a name meaning "fugitive, refugee"), son of Ṭābu-melû (probably a Hurrian name). It is significant because, in addition to portraying eighteen divine icons around its top, it lists forty-seven gods in its inscription, more than any other similar object.

The stele

Recovered from Susa during the French excavations under Jacques de Morgan at the turn of the twentieth century, excavation reference Sb 26, it is currently located in the Musée du Louvre. The text covers around three quarters of the surface of the sides with the top part engraved with a relief of religious iconography.

It records the granting of a tract of land in the limits of the town of Šaknanâ, on the banks of the Mēdandan canal, district of Ḫudādu (Baghdad?), originally by Meli-Šipak. The failure to issue a record of this deed resulted in its contention by Munnabbittu’s neighbor, Aḫūnea (probably the hypocoristic form of his name), son of Dayyān-Marduk, who laid claim to a three GUR and twenty qa portion of the field, claiming that "it is the 'gate' of my field". On appeal to Marduk-apla-iddina I, the former governor of Ḫudādu, Kidin-Ninurta, under whose period in office the original grant had been made, and Ṣir-šum-iddina, his successor, together with various city elders, were consulted and unanimously upheld Munnabittu’s claim. Ṣir-šum-iddina and the scribe Bēl-ippašra were dispatched to resurvey the property and confirmed its size.

Cast of characters

 Meli-Šipak (the earlier king, grantor)
 Munnabittu, son of Ṭābu(DUG.GA)-melû (the beneficiary)
 Izkur-Nabû, “son of Arad-Ea” (neighbor)
 Kidin-Ninurta, son of Namru (ex-governor of Ḫudādu)
 Nabû-šum-iddina, son of Šuzib-Marduk, “son of Arad-Ea” (Meli-Šipak’s royal scribe)
 Marduk-apla-iddina I, (the king rendering judgement)
 Aḫūnea, son of Dayyān-Marduk (the plaintiff)
 Ṣir-šum-iddina, son of Aḫu-banû (governor of Ḫudādu)
 Bēl-ippašra, "son of Arad-Ea" (scribe, surveyor)

Witnesses:

 Libur-zanin-Ekur, ša rēši (lúSAG), a court official
 Ḫa-SAR-du,  sukkal mu'erru, previously a beneficiary himself in the land grant to Ḫasardu kudurru, on which both Libur-zanin-Ekur and Iqīša-Bau appeared as witnesses
 Marduk-kudurrī-uṣur, ša rēš šarri (lúSAG LUGAL), a court official
 Uzib-Bēl, sukkal, a court official
 Iqīša-Bau, "son of Arad-Ea," pīḫātu, a minor provincial official?

Divine names and symbols
The kudurru's significance lies in its extensive list of Mesopotamian deities used in the curse section, the longest by far to appear on any similar object, where around a dozen usually suffice. The elaborate endorsements, however, provided no protection to the monument as within around fifteen years it was taken back to Elam as war-booty by the invading army of Šutruk-Naḫḫunte.  The following gives the names of the gods and goddesses in the order in which they appear in the text, with the cuneiform synonym in parentheses when the name is not written phonetically. The divine symbols are numbered as per Hinke's diagram (opposite).

 Anu (4. shrine with tiara)
 Enlil (5. shrine with tiara)
 Ea (6. goat-fish in front of shrine)
 Ninhursag
 Sîn (d30) (1. crescent moon)
 Ningal
 Šamaš (dUTU) (3. sun-disc)
 Aya (dGAL)
 Bunene (dḪAR)
 Kittu (dNIN.GI.NA)
 Mêšara (dNIN.SI)
 dAT.GI.MAḪ
 dŠE.RU.ŠIŠ
 Marduk (dAMAR.UTU) (15. spade)
 Zarpanitum
 Nabû (dAG) (11. horned dragon before brick shrine)
 Tašmetum
 Ninurta (12. double lion-headed symbol)
 Ninkarrag (Gula) (7. dog)
 Zababa (10. vulture-headed symbol)
 Bau (16. the walking bird)
 Damu
 GEŠTIN.NAM
 Ištar (2. Venus-star)
 Nanaya
 Anunitum
 Adad (dIM) (14. bull reclining beneath lightning bolt)
 Šala
 Mišarru
 Nergal (dU.GUR (9. lion-headed symbol)
 Lâṣ
 Išum
 Šubula
 Lugalgirra
 Meslamtae’a
 Šarṣarbati (dLUGAL.GIŠ.A.TU.GAB.LIŠ)
 Ma’-me-tum
 Alammuš (dLÀL)
 Ningublaga (dNIN.BAD)
 Tišpak
 Ištarān (dKA.DI) (18. coiled snake)
 Nusku (dPA+KU) (13. lamp)
 Sadarnunna
 Uraš (dIB)
 Ninegal
 Šuqamuna (17. bird on a perch)
 Šumalia (17. bird on a perch)
Išḫara (8. scorpion), the only symbol not named

Principal publications

  and pl. 9–10: translation and photographs
  line art

References

Kassites
Kudurru boundary stones
Sculpture of the Ancient Near East
Near East and Middle East antiquities of the Louvre